Mountain View is a neighbourhood in the city of Nairobi.

Overview
It is a middle-income to lower middle-income neighbourhood significantly characterised by single-family homes with a gated community.

Mountain View, an electoral ward, borrows its name from the estate. It covers the Gichagi and Mountain View sub-locations of Nairobi.

As per the 2019 census, Mountain View had a population of 22,294, with a population density of 10,752/km2 in a land area of 2.1km2.

References

 

Suburbs of Nairobi